The Valley Resounds (Romanian: Răsună valea) is a 1950 Romanian drama film directed by Paul Călinescu. Communist volunteers work to construct a new railway line.

The film's sets were designed by Stefan Norris.

Cast
 Marcel Anghelescu 
 Geo Barton 
 Radu Beligan 
 Bob Calinescu 
 Angela Chiuaru 
 Al Ionescu-Ghibericon 
 Eugenia Popovici 
 Horia Serbanescu 
 Nicolae Sireteanu 
 Ion Talianu 
 Maria Voluntaru
 Livius Cecală

References

Bibliography 
 Liehm, Mira & Liehm, Antonín J. The Most Important Art: Eastern European Film After 1945. University of California Press, 1977.

External links 
 

1950 films
1950 drama films
Romanian drama films
1950s Romanian-language films
Films directed by Paul Călinescu
Romanian black-and-white films